The Secunderabad–Nanded Express is a passenger rail service that operates between the cities of Secunderabad in the Indian state of Andhra Pradesh and Nanded in the Indian state of Maharashtra. It is operated by the South Central Railway region of the Indian Railways.  The service lists under the Nanded division of the South Central Railway and was restarted in early 2006 after the complete conversion of the Nanded division from metre gauge to broad gauge. This is a daily service.

Train Numbers 
Secunderabad to Nanded- 7039
Nanded to Secunderabad- 7046

Timings 
 Secunderabad-Nanded departure—07.25 (07:25 AM) arrival—13.30 (01:30 PM)
 Nanded-Secunderabad departure—14.40 (02:40 PM) arrival—20.20 (08:20 PM)
 The train travels a distance of 284 km.
 The duration of the journey is 6 hours and 10 minutes.

Locomotive 
The entire Nanded division of the South Central Railway has non-electrified track. Hence, a single WDM2A locomotive hauls the train both ways, the locomotive usually belongs to the Guntakal, Maula Ali or Pune sheds.

Stoppages 

Train no. 7039, Secunderabad JN to Nanded (SC to NED) stops in the following stations:

SC—Secunderabad Junction (Source)
MJF—Malkajgiri
BMO—Bolarum
GWV—Gowdavalli
MED—Medchal
WDR—Wadiaram
MZL—Mirzapalli
AKE—Akanapet
KMC—Kamareddi
NZB—Nizamabad
BSX—Basar
DAB—Dharmabad
UMRI—Umri
MUE—Mudkhed Junction
NED—Nanded (Destination)

Train no. 7040, Nanded to Secunderabad JN (NED to SC) stops in the reverse order of the above list.

See also
 Rail transport in India
 South Central Railway
 Nizamabad - Visakhapatnam Express

Express trains in India
Transport in Nanded
Transport in Secunderabad
Rail transport in Telangana
Rail transport in Maharashtra